Erling Gjone (8 May 1898 – 10 October 1990) was a Norwegian architectural historian and antiquarian. 
Gjone made significant contributions to the preservation of medieval-era Norwegian buildings. He is most noted for his work with the restoration of the Archbishop's Palace (Erkebispegården)  in Trondheim.

Biography
He was born in Levanger  in Nord-Trøndelag, Norway. He was the son of David Edvard Gjone (1871–1951) and Kristiane Øwre (1877–1970). After completing his studies at the  Norwegian Technical College (NTH), Gjone was an assistant architect with Ole Landmark in Bergen from 1920 to 1924 after which he joined professor Johan Meyer at NTH in Trondheim.
In 1931 Gjone was employed as a lecturer in early Norwegian construction at  NTH.

During the German conquest of Norway in 1940 he took part in the Battle of Hegra Fortress, and later emerged as leader of the local chapter of Milorg, (the Norwegian resistance movement) in Trøndelag at the end of the war.

From 1947 until 1968, he was Professor of Architectural Development.  He was a member of the committees for restoration of Austråttborgen and Bergenhus Fortress. His most ambitious undertaking was with the restoration of the  medieval Archbishop's Palace in Trondheim  (1962–75).

Honors
Knight of the Order of St. Olav in 1961 and Commander in 1973
King's Medal for Courage in the Cause of Freedom (GB)
Defence Medal  
Urnesmedalja

References

Related reading
 Nordeide, Sæbjørg Walaker  (2003)  Erkebispegården i Trondheim (Oslo : Norsk institutt for kulturminneforskning) 

1898 births
1990 deaths
People from Levanger
Norwegian Institute of Technology alumni
Academic staff of the Norwegian Institute of Technology
Architects from Trondheim
Norwegian architectural historians
Norwegian antiquarians
Norwegian Army personnel of World War II
Norwegian prisoners of war in World War II
World War II prisoners of war held by Germany
Norwegian resistance members
Recipients of the King's Medal for Courage in the Cause of Freedom
20th-century antiquarians